Samuel Helenius (born 26 November 2002) is a Finnish professional ice hockey forward who currently plays for the Ontario Reign in the American Hockey League (AHL) as a prospect to the Los Angeles Kings in the National Hockey League (NHL). He was selected by the Kings in the second-round, 59th overall, of the 2021 NHL Entry Draft.

Playing career
Helenius as a youth played in his native Finland within the Jokerit development system. Moving to fellow Finnish club, JYP Jyväskylä, Helenius made his professional debut in the Liiga during the 2020–21 season.

In his first full season in the Liiga, Helenius collected 7 goals and 14 points in 54 games with JYP. With his large physical frame and promising development, Helenius was selected at the 2021 NHL Entry Draft in the second-round, 58th overall, by the Los Angeles Kings who traded a third and fourth round pick to the Carolina Hurricanes in order to move back into the second-round.

On 13 August 2021, Helenius was signed to a three-year, entry-level contract with the Kings.

Continuing his development in the Liiga with KalPa in the 2021–22 season, Helenius was named an alternate captain and posted 3 goals and 9 points in 48 games. On 28 March 2022, Helenius left Finland and moved to North America, assigned by the Kings to primary AHL affiliate, the Ontario Reign, for the remainder of the season.

Personal
Born in Dallas, Texas, Samuel is the son of former NHL defenseman and enforcer, Sami Helenius. He is a dual citizen of Finland and the U.S.

Career statistics

Regular season and playoffs

International

References

External links
 

2002 births
Living people
JYP Jyväskylä players
Finnish ice hockey centres
Los Angeles Kings draft picks
Ontario Reign (AHL) players
Sportspeople from Dallas
American people of Finnish descent